Escape from Cape Coma is the only studio album by American nu metal band Twisted Method. It was released on July 15, 2003 through MCA Records. It was the label's final release, following its absorption into Geffen Records a month prior.

Reception 
Escape from Cape Coma received polarized reviews from critics.

Hit Parader praised Twisted Method's flux of energy on the album, which was described as "coil[ing] like a striking cobra and blast[ing] like a Tomahawk missile", and praised the band for not copying the "same-old sounds" of "today's hard rock scene". Dave Doray of IGN was highly positive of the album and awarded it an "Editors' Choice Award". While he praised the album's "sonic intensity" and Derrick Tribbett's diverse vocal performances, he noted that the album's swearing and "full-tilt" energy was, at points, excessive.

Writing for Allmusic, Johnny Loftus criticised Escape from Cape Coma's "heavily treated production" and excessive swearing, and felt that the album and its aggressive outlook was formularic and ingenuine. ThePRP's Jason Doe was heavily critical of the album, labelling it a "musical abortion" and called it "an album for listeners who desire anthemic, brainless hard rock that they can sing-a-long to without even remotely thinking; An album that rebels against absolutely nothing, but does so in such a manner that you almost believe Twisted Method actually have a purpose."

Track listing

Personnel 

Personnel per liner notes.

Twisted Method

 Derrick "Tripp" Tribbett – vocals
 Andrew Howard – guitar/vocals
 Derek DeSantis – bass/vocals
 Ben Goins – drums/vocals

Production

 Jason Slater – producer
 Eddie Wohl – additional production, mixing (for Scrap 60 Productions)
 Rob Caggiano – additional production, mixing (for Scrap 60 Productions)
 Paul Orofino – additional production, mixing (for Scrap 60 Productions)
 Rob Brill – engineering
 George Marino – mastering (at Sterling Sound)
 Gary Ashley – executive producerManagement

 Hans Haedelt – A&R
 Jock Elliott – marketing director
 Charlie Pennachio – representation (for 3Sixty Management)
 Steve Ballard – representation (for 3Sixty Management)
 Kenny Meisclas – legal representation (for Grubham, Indursky & Schindler)

Artwork and design

 Tim Sledman – art direction (with Twisted Method), design
 JP Robinson – design
 Justin Stephens – photography
 John Millhauser – set design
 Katharine Adams – stylist (with Twisted Method)
 Hee Soo Kwon – hair/makeup stylist

References 

2003 debut albums
MCA Records albums
Albums produced by Jason Slater
Albums produced by Eddie Wohl